George Edward Bush (1883 – 1936) was an English professional footballer who played as a winger.

References

1883 births
1936 deaths
Footballers from Canning Town
English footballers
Association football wingers
Leyton F.C. players
Grimsby Town F.C. players
English Football League players